The 1962 Isle of Man TT was a FIM event held on 4 June 1962 at the Snaefell Mountain Course. It was part of the 1962 Grand Prix motorcycle racing season.

1962 Isle of Man Lightweight TT 125cc final standings
3 Laps (113.00 Miles) Mountain Course.

1962 Sidecar TT final standings
3 Laps (113.00 Miles) Mountain Course.

1962 Isle of Man Lightweight TT 250cc final standings
6 Laps (226.38 Miles) Mountain Course.

1962 Isle of Man Junior TT 350cc final standings
6 Laps (236.38 Miles) Mountain Course.

1962 50cc Ultra-Lightweight TT final standings
2 Laps (75.46 Miles) Mountain Course.

 Fastest Lap; Ernst Degner 29 minutes 58.6 seconds, 75.72 mph.

1962 Isle of Man Senior TT 500cc final standings
6 Laps (236.38 Miles) Mountain Course.

Sources

See also
Beryl Swain

Isle of Man Tt
Tourist Trophy
Isle of Man TT
Isle of Man TT